Elizabeth (Beth) Lew-Williams is an historian and professor of Asian American history at Princeton University, the first ever appointed by the school. She holds a Ph.D. in history from Stanford University and was a faculty fellow at Northwestern University. Her research focuses on Asian American studies, migration, ethnic studies, violence, and the history of the U.S. West.
She is the author of The Chinese Must Go: Violence, Exclusion and the Making of the Alien in America.

References 

Princeton University faculty
Northwestern University fellows
American historians
Historians of the United States
Year of birth missing (living people)
Living people